The arrondissement of Rochefort is an arrondissement (district) in the Charente-Maritime department in the region of Nouvelle-Aquitaine, France. It has 78 communes.

Composition

The communes of the arrondissement of Rochefort, and their INSEE codes, are:

 Aigrefeuille-d'Aunis (17003)
 Anais (17007)
 Ardillières (17018)
 Arvert (17021)
 Ballon (17032)
 Beaugeay (17036)
 Bouhet (17057)
 Bourcefranc-le-Chapus (17058)
 La Brée-les-Bains (17486)
 Breuil-la-Réorte (17063)
 Breuillet (17064)
 Breuil-Magné (17065)
 Cabariot (17075)
 Chaillevette (17079)
 Chambon (17080)
 Champagne (17083)
 Le Château-d'Oléron (17093)
 Ciré-d'Aunis (17107)
 La Devise (17457)
 Dolus-d'Oléron (17140)
 Échillais (17146)
 L'Éguille (17151)
 Étaules (17155)
 Forges (17166)
 Fouras (17168)
 Genouillé (17174)
 Le Grand-Village-Plage (17485)
 La Gripperie-Saint-Symphorien (17184)
 Le Gua (17185)
 Île-d'Aix (17004)
 Landrais (17203)
 Loire-les-Marais (17205)
 Lussant (17216)
 Marennes-Hiers-Brouage (17219)
 Marsais (17221)
 Les Mathes (17225)
 Meschers-sur-Gironde (17230)
 Moëze (17237)
 Moragne (17246)
 Mornac-sur-Seudre (17247)
 Muron (17253)
 Nieulle-sur-Seudre (17265)
 Port-des-Barques (17484)
 Puyravault (17293)
 Rochefort (17299)
 Royan (17306)
 Saint-Agnant (17308)
 Saint-Augustin (17311)
 Saint-Coutant-le-Grand (17320)
 Saint-Crépin (17321)
 Saint-Denis-d'Oléron (17323)
 Saint-Froult (17329)
 Saint-Georges-de-Didonne (17333)
 Saint-Georges-d'Oléron (17337)
 Saint-Georges-du-Bois (17338)
 Saint-Hippolyte (17346)
 Saint-Jean-d'Angle (17348)
 Saint-Just-Luzac (17351)
 Saint-Laurent-de-la-Prée (17353)
 Saint-Mard (17359)
 Saint-Nazaire-sur-Charente (17375)
 Saint-Palais-sur-Mer (17380)
 Saint-Pierre-d'Amilly (17382)
 Saint-Pierre-d'Oléron (17385)
 Saint-Pierre-la-Noue (17340)
 Saint-Saturnin-du-Bois (17394)
 Saint-Sornin (17406)
 Saint-Sulpice-de-Royan (17409)
 Saint-Trojan-les-Bains (17411)
 Soubise (17429)
 Surgères (17434)
 Le Thou (17447)
 Tonnay-Charente (17449)
 La Tremblade (17452)
 Vaux-sur-Mer (17461)
 Vergeroux (17463)
 Virson (17480)
 Vouhé (17482)

History

The arrondissement of Rochefort was created in 1800. At the January 2017 reorganisation of the arrondissements of Charente-Maritime, it gained one commune from the arrondissement of La Rochelle, one commune from the arrondissement of Saintes and three communes from the arrondissement of Saint-Jean-d'Angély, and it lost two communes to the arrondissement of La Rochelle.

As a result of the reorganisation of the cantons of France which came into effect in 2015, the borders of the cantons are no longer related to the borders of the arrondissements. The cantons of the arrondissement of Rochefort were, as of January 2015:

 Aigrefeuille-d'Aunis
 Le Château-d'Oléron
 Marennes
 Rochefort-Centre
 Rochefort-Nord
 Rochefort-Sud
 Royan-Est
 Royan-Ouest
 Saint-Agnant
 Saint-Pierre-d'Oléron
 Surgères
 Tonnay-Charente
 La Tremblade

References

Rochefort